Vakha Shamaudinovich Keligov (born 29 January 1985) is a former Russian professional football player.

Club career
He played in the Russian Football National League for FC Angusht Nazran in 2006.

External links
 
 

1985 births
Living people
Russian footballers
Association football midfielders
FC Angusht Nazran players